Saint-Germain-d'Aunay is a commune in the Orne department in the Normandy region of France with a population of 144 inhabitants (2018).

History 
A manor was built at the end of the 15th century by Guillaume de Mallevouë, knight and lord of the manors of Saint-Germain and Notre-Dame-d'Aulnay. All that is left is the lodge and a bartizan. The majority of the manor was destroyed by the French Catholic League in 1589 and was replaced by a half-timbered building.

In 1822, Saint-Germain-d'Aunay (377 inhabitants in 1821) absorbed Notre-Dame-d'Aunay (123 inhabitants), further to its south. Both villages are shown on the Cassini map of the area.

See also
Communes of the Orne department

References

Saintgermaindaunay